Tasy Verst, Tsaghkadzor or Onverst is a village de facto in the Shushi Province of the breakaway Republic of Artsakh, de jure in the Shusha District of Azerbaijan, in the disputed region of Nagorno-Karabakh.

Toponymy 
The village was renamed from Tsaghkadzor/Saxkadzor to Onverst in 1999 by the Azerbaijani government.

History 
During the Soviet period, the village was a part of the Shusha District of the Nagorno-Karabakh Autonomous Oblast.

Economy and culture 
The population is mainly engaged in agriculture and animal husbandry. The village is a part of the community of Yeghtsahogh.

Demographics 
The village has an Armenian-majority population, had 15 inhabitants in 2005, and 4 inhabitants in 2015.

References 

Populated places in Shusha District
Populated places in Shushi Province